Richard Albert Hundley (September 1, 1931 – February 25, 2018) was an American pianist and composer of art songs for voice and piano.

Early life
Hundley was born in Cincinnati, Ohio. When he was seven years old he moved to his paternal grandmother's home in Covington, Kentucky and began piano lessons.  At the age of ten, Hundley attended his first opera, Il trovatore by Giuseppe Verdi.

He began taking piano lessons with Madame Illona Voorm at the Cincinnati Conservatory of Music when he was eleven. At age fourteen, Hundley performed a Mozart piano concerto with the Northern Kentucky Symphony Orchestra. Two years later he soloed with the Cincinnati Symphony.

Career
Hundley moved to New York City in 1950 and enrolled in the Manhattan School of Music but dropped out shortly after.

In 1960, he was selected for the Metropolitan Opera Chorus. In preparation for this position, he learned to sing ten operas in four different languages.

Hundley never went abroad to study, but credited his development as a songwriter to his three years in the Metropolitan Opera chorus and the longer time he spent as accompanist for Zinka Milanov’s lessons.

Hundley shared his original songs with some of the singers at the Metropolitan. As a result, Anneliese Rothenberger, Rosalind Elias, Anna Moffo, Teresa Stratas, Lili Chookasian, John Reardon, and Betty Allen began performing his songs on stage.

In 1962 when soprano Eileen DiTullio sang two of his songs, Softly the Summer and Spring, in a concert at The Town Hall in New York City. Paul Kapp, Director of the General Music Publishing Company, was in attendance and he scheduled a meeting with Hundley to discuss publishing the two compositions. During the period of 1962-1964, the General Music Publishing Company published seven of Hundley's songs.

The American art song specialist Paul Sperry began performing and advocating Hundley's music in the late 1960s.

In 1982 the International American Music Competition included his "Eight Songs" set in its repertoire list. The 1983 and 1984 Newport Music Festivals also performed his work.

In 1987, Hundley was declared one of the standard American composers for vocalists by the International American Music Competition.

Compositions

For solo voice
Care Charming Sleep (date?)Softly the Summer (1957)Epitaph on a Wife (1957)The Astronomers (1959)Isaac Greentree (An Epitaph) (1960)Elizabeth Pitty (An Epitaph) (1960)Joseph Jones (An Epitaph) (1961)Wild Plum (1961)Ballad on Queen Anne's Death (1962)Spring (1962)For Your Delight (1962)I am not lonely (1963)Maiden Snow (1963)Daffodils (1963)My Master Hath a Garden (1963)Postcard from Spain (1964)Some Sheep are Loving (1964)Screw Spring (1968)Come Ready and See Me (1971)Lions Have Lain in Grasses Before (1971)Vocal Quartets on Poems by James Purdy (1971)Birds, U.S.A. (1972, written for soprano Billie Lynn Daniel)I Do (1974)Are They Shadows that We See? (1974)Evening Hours (1975)Bartholomew Green (1978)Sweet Suffolk Owl (1979)When Orpheus Played (1979)Arise My Love (1981)The Girls of Golden Summers (1982)Will there really be a Morning?(1987)Moonlight's Watermelon (1989)Seashore Girls (1989)Straightway beauty on me waits (1989)Strings in the Earth and Air (1989)Well Welcome (1989)Awake the Sleeping Sun (1991)The Elephant is Slow to Mate (1992)White Fields (1995)The Whales of California (1996)O My Darling Troubles Heaven With Her Loveliness (1998)Heart, We Will Forget Him (2004)

DuetJust Why Johnnie Was Jimmie (1964)

ChoralBall (1985)Come Ready and See Me (2004)

DiscographyUnder the bluest sky...Songs of Richard Hundley David Parks (tenor) Read Gainsford (piano)
The Astronomers, with Frederica von Stade (mezzo-soprano) and Martin Katz (piano), CBS, 1982
Come Ready And See Me, with Frederica von Stade (mezzo-soprano) and Martin Katz (piano), CBS, 1982

References

Further reading
 American Art Song and American Poetry. by Ruth C. Friedberg 
 The solo vocal repertoire of Richard Hundley: A pedagogical and performance guide to the published works Dissertation by Esther Jane Hardenbergh
 Carol Kimball, Song: A Guide to Art Song Style and Literature (Wisconsin: Hal Leonard Corporation, 2006).
 Victoria Etnier Villamil, A Singer's Guide to the American Art Song: 1870–1980 (Lanham, MD & London: The Scarecrow Press, Inc., 1993; 2004).
 Conversations with Writers II, Volume 1, eds. Stanley Ellin, John Baker (Michigan: Gale Research Co., 1978). See the entry on writer James Purdy, who discusses his collaboration with Hundley.

External links
Homepage of "Life & Work of Richard Hundley
Rainer J. Hanshe, "Ready All the Time Like Gunpowder: On Composing Songs with James Purdy--An Interview with Richard Hundley", Hyperion: On the Future of Aesthetics'', Vol. IV, No. 1 (March 2011). This is a special issue devoted to writer James Purdy.
Richard Hundley papers, 1900s-2014 Music Division, The New York Public Library.

1931 births
2018 deaths
20th-century American composers
20th-century American pianists
20th-century American male musicians
20th-century classical composers
20th-century classical pianists
21st-century American composers
21st-century American pianists
21st-century American male musicians
21st-century classical composers
21st-century classical pianists
American classical composers
American male classical composers
American classical pianists
American male pianists
Classical musicians from Ohio
Male classical pianists
Musicians from Cincinnati
Musicians from Kentucky
People from Covington, Kentucky
Songwriters from Kentucky
Songwriters from Ohio
American male songwriters